Joseph Crozier (4 December 1889 – 1960) was an English professional footballer who played as a wing half.

References

1889 births
1960 deaths
People from Middlesbrough
English footballers
Association football wing halves
Middlesbrough F.C. players
Bradford (Park Avenue) A.F.C. players
Grimsby Town F.C. players
English Football League players